Kidney cancer, also known as renal cancer, is a group of cancers that starts in the kidney. Symptoms may include blood in the urine, lump in the abdomen, or back pain. Fever, weight loss, and tiredness may also occur. Complications can include spread to the lungs or brain.

The main types of kidney cancer are renal cell cancer (RCC), transitional cell cancer (TCC), and Wilms' tumor. RCC makes up approximately 80% of kidney cancers, and TCC accounts for most of the rest. Risk factors for RCC and TCC include smoking, certain pain medications, previous bladder cancer, being overweight, high blood pressure, certain chemicals, and a family history. Risk factors for Wilms' tumor include a family history and certain genetic disorders such as WAGR syndrome. Diagnosis may be suspected based on symptoms, urine testing, and medical imaging. It is confirmed by tissue biopsy.

Treatment may include surgery, radiation therapy, chemotherapy, immunotherapy, and targeted therapy. Kidney cancer newly affected about 403,300 people and resulted in 175,000 deaths globally in 2018. Onset is usually after the age of 45. Males are affected more often than females. The overall five-year survival rate is 75% in the United States, 71% in Canada, 70% in China, and 60% in Europe. For cancers that are confined to the kidney, the five-year survival rate is 93%, if it has spread to the surrounding lymph nodes it is 70%, and if it has spread widely, it is 12%. Kidney cancer has been identified as the 13th most common form of cancer, and is responsible for 2% of the world's cancer cases and deaths. The incidence of kidney cancer has continued to increase since 1930. Renal cancer is more commonly found in populations of urban areas than rural areas.

Signs and symptoms
Early on, kidney masses do not typically cause any symptoms and are undetectable on physical examination. As kidney cancer becomes more advanced it classically results in blood in the urine, flank or back pain, and a mass. Other symptoms that are consistent with advanced disease include weight loss, fever, night sweats, palpable swollen lymph nodes in the neck, non-reducing varicocele, bone pain, continuous cough, and bilateral lower leg swelling.

The classic triad of visible blood in the urine (hematuria), flank pain and palpable abdominal mass occurs in less than 15% of the cases.  RCC may present with signs and symptoms caused by the substances the cancer cell produce (i.e. paraneoplastic syndromes).

Paraneoplastic syndromes caused by kidney cancer can be broadly classified as endocrine and non-endocrine. Endocrine dysfunctions include increase in blood calcium levels (hypercalcemia), high blood pressure (hypertension), increased red bloods (polycythemia), liver dysfunction, milky nipple discharge unrelated normal breast-feeding (galactorrhea), and Cushing's syndrome. Non-endocrine dysfunctions include deposition of protein in tissue (amyloidosis), decrease in hemoglobin or red blood cells (anemia), disorders of nerves, muscles (neuromyopathies), blood vessels (vasculopathy) and blood clotting mechanisms (coagulopathy).

Causes
Factors that increase the risk of kidney cancer include smoking, high blood pressure, obesity, faulty genes, a family history of kidney cancer, having kidney disease that needs dialysis, being infected with hepatitis C, and previous treatment for testicular cancer or cervical cancer.

There are also other possible risk factors such as kidney stones being investigated.

About 25-30% of kidney cancer is attributed to smoking. Smokers have a 1.3 times higher risk of developing kidney cancer compared to non-smokers. Moreover, there is a dose-dependent increased risk of cancer development. Men who smoke more than 20 cigarettes per day have twice the risk. Likewise, women who smoke more than 20 cigarettes per day have 1.5 times the risk of non-smokers. After 10 years of smoking cessation a substantial reduction is seen in the risk of developing kidney cancer.

Diagnosis
Due to the increase in ultrasound and CT imaging for nonspecific abdominal complaints, kidney masses are frequently incidentally diagnosed on medical imaging. More than 60% of renal cell carcinoma (the most common type of kidney cancer), are diagnosed incidentally by abdominal imaging for nonspecific abdominal complaints.

Kidney masses can be classified by the nature of the cells in the growth, or by its appearance on radiography. The term cancer refers to a malignant tumor, which is an uncontrolled growth of abnormal cells. However, kidney masses can be due to growth of normal tissue (benign), inflammatory (a reaction of the immune system), or vascular (cells of the blood vessels).

Medical imaging 
Since there is a large differential diagnosis for a kidney tumor, the first step is to characterize the mass with medical imaging to assess its likelihood of being benign or malignant. Ultrasonography is sometimes used to evaluate a suspected kidney mass, as it can characterize cystic and solid kidney masses without radiation exposure and at relative low cost. Radiologically tumors are grouped based on appearance into simple cystic, complex cystic, or solid. The most important differentiating feature of a cancerous and non-cancerous tumor on imaging is enhancement. Simple cysts, which are defined by strict criteria are safe to be monitored if the person does not have any symptoms.  However, all masses that are not clearly simple cysts should be further evaluated and confirmed by alternate imaging techniques.

Computed tomography (CT) of the abdomen administered with and without IV contrast is the ideal imaging to diagnose and stage kidney cancer. There is tentative evidence that iodinated contrast agents may cause worsening of kidney function in people with chronic kidney disease (CKD) with a glomerular filtration rate (GFR) less than 45ml/min/1.73m2 and should therefore be given cautiously in this group.

Abdominal magnetic resonance imaging (MRI) is an alternative imaging method that can be used to characterize and stage a kidney mass. It may be suggested if contrast material cannot be given. MRI can also evaluate the inferior vena cava if the mass is suspected to extend outside the kidney.

Since the lungs are the most common organ for kidney cancer to spread to, a chest X-ray or CT scan may be ordered based on the person's risk for metastatic disease.

Histopathologic classification 

The most common type of kidney malignancy is renal cell carcinoma, which is thought to originate from cells in the proximal convoluted tubule of the nephron. Another type of kidney cancer although less common, is transitional cell cancer (TCC) or urothelial carcinoma of the renal pelvis. The renal pelvis is the part of the kidney that collects urine and drains it into a tube called the ureter. The cells that line the renal pelvis are called transitional cells, and are also sometimes called urothelial cells. The transitional/urothelial cells in the renal pelvis are the same type of cells that line the ureter and bladder. For this reason TCC of the renal pelvis is distinct from RCC and is thought to behave more like bladder cancer. Other rare types of kidney cancers that can arise from the urothelial cells of the renal pelvis are squamous cell carcinoma and adenocarcinoma.

Other causes of kidney cancer include the following:
 Sarcoma- for example leiomyosarcoma, liposarcoma, angiosarcoma, clear-cell sarcoma and rhabdomyosarcoma are types of sarcomas that have occurred in the kidney
 Metastatic tumor from distant organ
 Lymphoma
 Wilms tumor- an embryonic tumor that is the most common type of kidney cancer in children
 Carcinoid tumor of the renal pelvis
 Carcinosarcoma
 Inverted urothelial papilloma- was traditionally regarded as a benign growth. However, there may be an increased risk for recurrence and transformation to TCC.

In children, Wilms tumor is the most common type of kidney cancer. Mesoblastic nephroma, although rare, also typically presents in childhood.

Renal cell carcinoma has been further divided into sub-types based on histological features and genetic abnormalities. The 2004 WHO Classification of the Renal Tumors of the Adults describes these categories:
 Clear cell RCC
 Multilocular clear cell RCC
 Papillary RCC
 Chromophobe RCC
 Carcinoma of the collecting ducts of Bellini
 Renal medullary carcinoma
 Xp11 translocation carcinomas
 Carcinoma associated with neuroblastoma
 Mucinous tubular and spindle cell carcinoma
 Mixed epithelial stromal tumor

Tumors that are considered benign include angiomyolipoma, oncocytoma, reninoma (juxtaglomerular cell tumor), and renal adenoma.

Immunohistochemistry

Laboratory studies 
People with suspected kidney cancer should also have their kidney function evaluated to help determine treatment options. Blood tests to determine kidney function include a comprehensive metabolic panel (CMP), a complete blood count (CBC). In addition, these tests help understand the overall health of the person, which can be affected by metastatic disease (disease that is outside of the kidney). For example, liver or bone involvement could result in abnormal liver enzymes, electrolyte abnormalities, or anemia. A urine sample should also be collected for urinalysis.

Biopsy 
The utility of renal mass biopsy (RMB) lies in that it can confirm malignancy with reliability, can direct therapy based on diagnosis, and can provide drainage.

Once imaging has been completed, renal mass biopsy should be considered if there is a high likelihood that the mass is hematologic, metastatic, inflammatory, or infectious. These types of lesions would not be managed surgically, differing from cancer originating from the kidney. Cancer originating outside the kidney and lymphoma are managed systemically.

RMB can accurately diagnose malignancy, however, it cannot reliably diagnose benign disease. In other words, if the biopsy shows cancer, there is a 99.8% chance that kidney cancer is present (Positive Predictive Value= 99.8%). A negative biopsy does not rule out a diagnosis of cancer.

Staging
Staging is the process that helps determine the extent and spread of the disease. Renal cell carcinoma is the only type of kidney cancer that can be staged. The first step of staging follows the TNM staging system proposed by the Union International Contre le Cancer that is widely used among cancers in other organs. The TNM staging system classifies the primary tumor (T), lymph nodes (N) and distant metastasis (M) of the disease. The American Joint Committee on Cancer (AJCC) published a Cancer Staging Manual revision in 2010 that describes the values of TMN for renal cell carcinoma.

Lymph node involvement is classified as either regional lymph node metastasis (N1), or no involvement (N0). Similarly, M1 describes distant metastasis, while M0 describes no distant metastasis.

The primary tumor of renal cell carcinoma is categorized in the table below, as according to the AJCC 8th Edition Cancer Staging Manual:

The lungs are the most common site for metastasis, with other common sites including bone, brain, liver, adrenal gland and distant lymph nodes.

Treatment
Treatment for kidney cancer depends on the type and stage of the disease. Surgery is the most common treatment as kidney cancer does not often respond to chemotherapy and radiotherapy. Surgical complexity can be estimated by the RENAL Nephrometry Scoring System. If the cancer has not spread it will usually be removed by surgery. In some cases this involves removing the whole kidney however most tumors are amenable to partial removal to eradicate the tumor and preserve the remaining normal portion of the kidney. Surgery is not always possible – for example, the patient may have other medical conditions that prevent it, or the cancer may have spread around the body and doctors may not be able to remove it. There is currently no evidence that body-wide medical therapy after surgery where there is no known residual disease, that is, adjuvant therapy, helps to improve survival in kidney cancer. If the cancer cannot be treated with surgery other techniques such as freezing the tumour or treating it with high temperatures may be used. However, these are not yet used as standard treatments for kidney cancer.

Other treatment options include biological therapies such as everolimus, torisel, nexavar, sutent, and axitinib, the use of immunotherapy including interferon and interleukin-2. Immunotherapy is successful in 10 to 15% of people. Sunitinib is the current standard of care in the adjuvant setting along with pazopanib; these treatments are often followed by everolimus, axitinib, and sorafenib. Immune checkpoint inhibitors are also in trials for kidney cancer, and some have gained approval for medical use.

In the second line setting, nivolumab demonstrated an overall survival advantage in advanced clear renal cell carcinoma over everolimus in 2015 and was approved by the FDA. Cabozantinib also demonstrated an overall survival benefit over everolimus and was approved by the FDA as a second-line treatment in 2016. Lenvatinib in combination with everolimus was approved in 2016 for patients who have had exactly one prior line of angiogenic therapy.

In Wilms' tumor, chemotherapy, radiotherapy and surgery are the accepted treatments, depending on the stage of the disease when it is diagnosed.

Children
The majority of kidney cancers reported in children are Wilms' tumors. These tumors can begin to grow when a fetus is still developing in the uterus, and may not cause problems until the child is a few years old. Wilms' tumor is most common in children under the age of 5, but can rarely be diagnosed in older children or in adults. It is still not clear what causes most Wilms' tumors. The most common symptoms are swelling of the abdomen and blood in the urine.

Epidemiology
Around 208,500 new cases of kidney cancer are diagnosed in the world each year, accounting for just under 2% of all cancers. The highest rates are recorded in North America and the lowest rates in Asia and Africa.

Lifestyle risk factors

Certain lifestyle factors have been associated with the development of renal cancer, although not all of them can be considered definitive causes. These include smoking, chemical carcinogens, radiation, viruses, diet and obesity, hypertension, diuretics, and alcohol consumption. Only a small percentage of kidney cancer cases have been linked to genetic factors. With obesity listed as one of the risk factors, daily physical activity and engaging in a healthy diet is proven to lower the rates of developing kidney cancer in the future.

Age

The incidence rate of renal cancer increases with the age of an individual, with 75 being the approximate age of the peak incidence rate, as of 2018. However, nearly one half of all cases are diagnosed before the age of 65. In both male and female children, renal tumors represent 2% to 6% of kidney cancer, with Wilms' tumor being the most common.

Sex

The incidence of kidney cancer is two times greater in men than in women, and this is thought to be due to biological differences. Mortality rates typically decrease more rapidly in women compared to men.

International variations

Incidence rates of kidney cancer can vary throughout the world. As of 2018, Czech Republic and Lithuania have the highest incidence rate of kidney cancer worldwide, with an age-standardized rate of 21.9/100,000 in males (Czech Republic) and 18.7/100,000 in males (Lithuania.) China, Thailand, and African countries (low-risk countries) have an incidence rate that is less than 2/100,000.

Since the early 2000s, Austria and Poland have been the only countries to report a decrease in kidney cancer rates.

Diagnosis access bias plays a large role in the epidemiology of kidney cancer. Differences in kidney cancer diagnosis across regions are likely due to differences in healthcare access, rather than a population's biological factors. Discrepancies in kidney cancer diagnosis has most likely led to the underrepresentation of mortality and incidence in low income countries.   

Race

Race and ethnicity may be a factor in the distribution of kidney cancer around the United States. There are higher incidence rates in Black men and Hispanics, an average rate for American Indians, and low rates in Asians in the United States. Black people with kidney cancer have lower mortality rates than Caucasians in the United States.

Screening

Accessibility for cancer screening is not very common due to high expenses. Improving cancer registries can improve care to those who have kidney cancer as well as decreasing the incidence and death rates. Safe and dependable treatment is key with the screening and treatment, which is not always the case in many developing nations.

United States
The United States' NIH estimates for 2013 around 64,770 new cases of kidney cancer and 13,570 deaths from the disease.

The incidence of kidney cancer is also increasing in the United States. This is thought to be a real increase, not only due to changes in the way the disease is diagnosed.

Europe
The most recent estimates of incidence of kidney cancer suggest that there are 63,300 new cases annually in the EU25. In Europe, kidney cancer accounts for nearly 3% of all cancer cases.
Kidney cancer is the eighth most common cancer in the UK (around 10,100 people were diagnosed with the disease in 2011), and it is the fourteenth most common cause of cancer death (around 4,300 people died in 2012).

References

External links 

 
Kidney diseases
Rare cancers
Hereditary cancers
Wikipedia medicine articles ready to translate